Nuno Santos may refer to:
Nuno Santos (footballer, born 1973), Portuguese football goalkeeper
Nuno Santos (footballer, born 1978), Portuguese football goalkeeper
Nuno Santos (footballer, born 1980), Portuguese football forward
Nuno Santos (footballer, born 1995), Portuguese football midfielder
Nuno Santos (footballer, born 1999), Portuguese football midfielder

See also
Nuno Espírito Santo (born 1974), Portuguese football goalkeeper and manager